Nikita Polyakov (born May 16, 1986) is an Uzbek former swimmer, who specialized in individual medley events. Polyakov qualified for the men's 400 m individual medley at the 2004 Summer Olympics in Athens, by clearing a FINA B-cut of 4:33.02 from the Russian Championships in Moscow. He participated in the first heat against three other swimmers Saša Imprić of Croatia, Andrew Mackay of the Cayman Islands, and Lin Yu-an of the Chinese Taipei. He rounded out a small field to last place and thirty-sixth overall by a 37.64-second margin behind Impric with a slowest time of 5:09.66.

References

1986 births
Living people
Uzbekistani male medley swimmers
Olympic swimmers of Uzbekistan
Swimmers at the 2004 Summer Olympics
21st-century Uzbekistani people